Deadliest Crash: The Le Mans 1955 Disaster is a documentary film made by Bigger Picture Films for the BBC in 2009. It was originally aired on BBC Four on Sunday, 16 May 2010. It was subsequently repeated on BBC Two and BBC Four.

The programme tells the story of the 1955 Le Mans disaster in which Pierre Levegh's Mercedes 300 SLR smashed into the crowd, killing 83 people and injuring 120 more.

References

External links 
 
 BBC Programme Page for The Deadliest Crash
 Official Web Page
 Bigger Picture Films

2009 television films
2009 films
British auto racing films
Documentary films about auto racing
Documentary films about disasters
2009 documentary films
2000s disaster films
British sports documentary films
2000s British films